Émiland Marie Gauthey ( in Chalon-sur-Saône –  in Paris) was a French mathematician, civil engineer and architect.

Gauthey became Chief Engineer of the États de Bourgogne in 1782, on the death of his predecessor and close collaborator, Thomas Dumorey. He was awarded the Légion d'honneur in 1804 on its creation by Napoleon Bonaparte. From 1805 until his death, he was the highest-ranked engineer in France.

Biography
Émiland Marie Gauthey was born at Chalon-sur-Saône on 3 December 1732 into a provincial petty bourgeois family. His father, Pierre Gauthey, was the local doctor: and his mother, Louise (or Louyse) née was born at Chagny on 27 August 1700 as the dauter of Emiland Lafouge, a company lawyer and Official Receiver for the salt store in Toulon-sur-Arroux.

From 1740 to 1748, he studied with brilliance at the Jesuit college in Chalon. At the age of sixteen, after his father died, he continued his studies at Versailles under the auspices of an uncle who was Professor of Mathematics at the École des pages du roi.

He met with the Dumont architect Jacques-Germain Soufflot, and started a lifelong friendship. He consulted Soufflot on the construction of the dome of Sainte-Geneviève, which became the Panthéon.

Graduating in 1758, he was awarded the post of deputy engineer at Chalon-sur-Saône, under Thomas Dumorey. He would wait twenty-four years, until Dumorey's death in 1782, to become the Chief Engineer of the États de Bourgogne (States of Burgundy) and to makeDijon his home. Shortly after, he was named Director.General of Burgundy Canals in 1783.

A brilliant technician, he was an exponent of the spirit of the Age of Enlightenment and of the Encyclopédie ou Dictionnaire raisonné des sciences, des arts et des métiers ("Encyclopaedia or Rational Dictionary of Sciences, Arts and Crafts"), as evidenced by his investigative Essay on Philosophical Language of 1774 – in which he envisages a kind of language of universal graphical signs like stenography –; and in his use of scientific advances in the building trade.

His civil engineering works, such as the bridges of Gueugnon, Navilly and Chalon-sur-Saône, helped to transform transportation methods and accelerated the Industrial Revolution in 19th-century Burgundy. It was in this forward-looking spirit that he participated in improving river navigation and building canals. He collaborated in the project to build a canal in Burgundy between the rivers Yonne and Saône (completed much later, in 1832) and he puis se consacre au canal de Franche-Comté de Saint-Jean-de-Losne/Saint-Symphorien-sur-Saône à Dole (also known as the ): this part of the project to connect the Rhine with the Rhône, built between 1783 and 1803, is also known as the  because it was opened by Louis V Joseph de Bourbon-Condé, lately Prince and Governor of Burgundy.

But his master work, "The greatest public work of the 18th Century", was the Canal du Centre (or "Canal du Charolais"), (built 1783–1793) between Digoin and Chalon-sur-Saône. Over  with 62 locks, it connected the Loire to the Saône, thus creating the primary route for boats from the English Channel to the Mediterranean Sea (the Loire having been connected to the Seine by the Canal de Briare).

Gauthey remained interested in development in Chalon-sur-Saône, his home town, where he rebuilt the quayside and built a theatre. These constructions are among many examples of neoclassical style in the area, including the dome of the pharmacy in the town, the churches at Givry and Louhans, the town hall at Tournus and the Château de Clermont-Montoison at Chagny.

Changes after the French Revolution brought Émiland Gauthey honours and high office: he was named the first  in 1791. At the age of 60 he moved to Paris, married his cousin and adopted his nephew Claude-Louis Navier, one of the most brilliant mathematicians and engineers of the early 19th century. in 1801 he became a member of the Conseil général des ponts et chaussées en 1801 and in 1805 its vice-president. He worked on Somme-Escaut link and several developments in Paris, such as a new water supply which would become the Canal de l'Ourcq), and projects on the Seine bridges and the Passerelle des Arts, built by Jacques Dillon.

Perhaps surprisingly, his place of death is unknown, but it is likely to be in a Parisian cemetery.

Works

Bridges

 ("Cravant Bridge") (1760) in the Yonne department.  long over 3 arched spans.
 ("Bridge over the Bourbince") (1786–1789) at Blanzy, Saône-et-Loire
 ("Bridge over the Guyotte") (1786–1789) at Navilly, Saône-et-Loire: one arch with a span of 
Bellevesvre Bridge (1787), Saône-et-Loire: arched road bridge over the Brenne with a total length of 
Navilly Bridge (1782–1790), Saône-et-Loire: arched bridge over the river Doubs,  over 5 spans
More-or-less destroyed in 1944 and rebuilt from scratch in 1950.

Buildings
Tournus Town Hall (1771)
Givry (Saône-et-Loire) Church (1772–1791)
Rebuilding of one wing of the Palais des ducs et des États de Bourgogne de Dijon (1776)
 The Obélisque de Dijon (1786)
Chalon-sur-Saône Theatre (1778)
The churches of Saint-Germain-du-Plain and Barizey (1778)
Restoration of the Château de Chagny (Saône-et-Loire) (1780)
Bourbon-Lancy Town Hall (1782)

Canals
 Canal de Franche-Comté from Saint-Jean-de-Losne/Saint-Symphorien-sur-Saône to Dole (also known as ) (1783–1803)
 Canal du Centre (also known as the Canal du Charolais), built 1783–1793 between Digoin and Chalon-sur-Saône, connecting the Loire and the Saône

Legacy 
 In 1808 a bust of him was carved by Guillaume Boichot, also from Chalon-sur-Saône, and exhibited at the Musée Vivant-Denon in the town.
 Since 1864, the Rue Gauthey in the 17th arrondissement of Paris has borne his name.
 A school in Chalon-sur-Saône bears his name.

Sources

References

External links 

 

18th-century French mathematicians
French civil engineers
18th-century French architects
1732 births
1806 deaths
École des Ponts ParisTech alumni
Corps des ponts
People from Chalon-sur-Saône
French bridge engineers